Sackets Harbor & Ellisburgh Railroad was incorporated on April 19, 1850, and opened on .

Its route took it from Sackets Harbor through Smithville, Henderson, and Belleville, joining the Rome, Watertown and Ogdensburg Railroad at Pierrepont Manor.

External links
The Sackets Harbor & Ellisburgh Railroad Company

Defunct New York (state) railroads
1850 establishments in New York (state)